Above The City is the debut album by American punk rock band Smoke or Fire, released in 2005. It was produced by Fat Mike under Fat Wreck Records, and was the band's first full-length album. Above the City has drawn comparison to Against Me! and Lawrence Arms, and has been called a "punching sincere punk rock album". The album reached #62 in CMJ's "Radio 100" in 2005, spending at least 5 weeks on the list.

Critical reception
In a positive review, Style Weekly wrote that "these songs run on a maximum of speed and a minimum of time, half of them touring the landscape of America and the other half, the landscape of emotion."

Track listing

All tracks by Joe McMahon

Personnel
Jeremy Cochran – guitar
Ethan Dussault – engineer, mixing, audio production
Fat Mike – producer
Ryan Greene – mixing
Ken Gurley – bass
Adam Krammer – engineer, audio engineer
Nick Maggiore – drums
Joe McMahon – guitar, vocals
Chrissy Piper – photography
Brad Vance – mastering
Winni Wintermeyer – design, photography

References

Smoke or Fire albums
2005 albums
Fat Wreck Chords albums